Yan Xujia (Simplified Chinese: 焉栩嘉 Pinyin: Yān Xǔjiā) is a Chinese rapper, singer, songwriter, dancer and actor. In 2015, he participated the program X-fire and debut as a member of X Nine. Later, he participated in Produce Camp 2019, finished third and debut as a member of R1SE.

Early life and education 
Yan was born on September 23, 2001, in Yantai, Shandong. He grew up in Shenzhen. In August 2020, he started his education at the Beijing Film Academy after being placed 23rd nationally in its admissions exams.

Career

2009-2015: Child actor 
Having been interested in acting from a young age, Yan started his career as a child actor. He began filming advertisements and joining talent shows since 2009. His first acting role began in the 2012 film . In March 2011, he filmed The Glamorous Imperial Concubine.

2015-2019: X Nine 
On July 21, 2015, he took part in the competition X Fire, where in the first episode, he was chosen to be in Li Yuchun's team. He was signed by EE-Media. On September 24, 2016, as part of X Nine, the album X Nine was released. On September 28, he debut as a member of the group X Nine, with Yan as a rapper on the team.

2019-2021: Produce Camp and R1SE 

On April 6, 2019, Produce Camp 2019 was released on Tencent Video, with Yan as one of the competitors. On June 8, 2019, in the finals of Produce Camp 2019, Yan finished third with vote of 11,164,384, and debut as a member of the group R1SE. On that same night, the song R.1.S.E. was released as their debut song, which also served as the promo song for the 2019 film Men in Black: International. On June 9, the drama Gank Your Heart was released, in which Yan portraying a young genius Esports competitor. On August 6, the first EP for R1SE was released. On August 11, the mini group reality show Super R1SE was released on Tencent Video. On October 12, Yan participated in the Super Novae Games as part of R1SE. On November 16, R1SE started their national concert tour, beginning in Guangzhou, the second concert was held in Chongqing. However, the third concert in Shanghai was cancelled due to COVID-19. Later, the documentary Autumn with 11 Youths was released on December 1, documenting R1SE crossing paths with youths of their age, and exploring different ways of life. The group's second EP was released as the same time as the documentary.

On January 19, 2020, Yan guest starred on the Hunan TV variety show Happy Camp. On May 29, Yan participated in the competition We Are Blazing as a member of R1SE. On June 12, the anniversary EP of R1SE was released.  On June 14, R1SE was disbanded, and Yan updated his Weibo account to include X Nine as part of his account name. In June, Yan was part of filming of a school drama . The drama was released on April 24, 2021.

Discography

References

External links 

 
 Yan Xujia profile on Wajijiwa Entertainment

R1SE members
Singers from Shandong
Chinese male singers
Mandopop singer-songwriters
Chinese Mandopop singers
Produce 101 (Chinese TV series) contestants
2001 births
Living people
People from Yantai
Actors from Yantai
Musicians from Yantai
Chinese male television actors